Glyphipterix achlyoessa, commonly known as the cocksfoot stem borer, is a species of moth in the family Glyphipterigidae. It is endemic to New Zealand and can be found throughout the country. This species inhabits meadows and open grasslands. The larvae are hosted by species in the genus Juncus as well as by the species Dactylis glomerata. Adult moths are commonly on the wing from October to December.

Taxonomy 
This species was first described by Edward Meyrick in 1880 and named Phryganostola achlyoessa. Meyrick used material he collected at the Wellington Botanic Garden at dusk in January. In 1915 Meyrick placed this species in the genus Glyphipteryx. George Hudson discussed and illustrated this species under the name Glyphipteryx achlyoessa in 1928. In 1986 the genus Glyphipteryx was judged an unjustified emendation of Glyphipterix Hübner so this species is now known as Glyphipterix achlyoessa. The male holotype specimen is held at the Natural History Museum, London.

Description 

 
Meyrick described the species as follows:

Distribution 
This moth is endemic to New Zealand and found throughout the country. It is regarded as being common.

Lifecycle and behaviour 
This species is on the wing from October to December. When disturbed it is likely to fly a short distance before landing on a grass stem.

Habitat and host plant 

This species prefers to inhabit meadows and grassy open spaces. It appears to prefer introduced grass species. A host plant for this species is Dactylis glomerata. Larvae have also been found boring into Juncus species.

References

Glyphipterigidae
Moths of New Zealand
Moths described in 1880
Endemic fauna of New Zealand
Taxa named by Edward Meyrick
Endemic moths of New Zealand